Kristen Joy Thorsness (born March 10, 1960, in Anchorage, Alaska) is an American former competitive rower and Olympic gold medalist. She was a member of the American women's eights team that won the gold medal at the 1984 Summer Olympics in Los Angeles, California, the first US women's crew to win Olympic gold. She grew up in Alaska, and started rowing at the University of Wisconsin. She was named the Big Ten Conference's rower of the decade and was runner up for Big Ten female athlete of the decade. In addition to the 1984 Olympic team, she was part of three World championship silver medal-winning crews (1982, 1983 and 1987) and was a member of the 1988 Olympic team. She is a member of the US Rowing Hall of Fame, an inaugural inductee into the Alaska Sports Hall of Fame, and is also a member of the University of Wisconsin Athletics Hall of Fame. She served on the US Rowing board of directors, and has been a US Rowing referee since 2003. After a 25-year career in law, she now teaches.

Thorsness was the first person (male or female) from Alaska, an Alaskan, to win an Olympic medal.

References

 

1960 births
American female rowers
Living people
New York (state) lawyers
Olympic gold medalists for the United States in rowing
Rowers at the 1984 Summer Olympics
Rowers at the 1988 Summer Olympics
Sportspeople from Anchorage, Alaska
Wisconsin Badgers women's rowers
Medalists at the 1984 Summer Olympics
World Rowing Championships medalists for the United States